This is a timeline documenting the events of heavy metal in the year 1970.

Newly formed bands 
A Foot in Coldwater
 Aerosmith
Babe Ruth
Bakery
 Bang
Blackfeather
Fuzzy Duck 
Heart  
Help
Il Rovescio della Medaglia
Irish Coffee 
Kahvas Jute
Kin Ping Meh
 Lucifer's Friend
 Mahogany Rush
 Necromandus
 Night Sun
Paladin
Patto
 Pink Fairies
 Queen
Rail
Road
Speed, Glue & Shinki
 Suck
T2 
 Toad
 Warhorse

Albums

January

February

March

May

June

August

September

October

November

December

Unknown 
Asterix - Asterix

Disbandments 
 The Jimi Hendrix Experience

References 

1970s in heavy metal music
Metal